Bosiram Siram is an Indian Politician of Indian National Congress.
He was elected as the Member of Legislative Assembly of 38-Pasighat East (ST) Constituency in the year 2009 and has since been promoted as the Education Minister of Arunachal Pradesh.
During his tenure he mainly acted on the electricity and water supply issues, which were major concern among the people of his constituency. Being much loved by people he was elected 2 times. He was then defeated by Kaling Moyong during the 2014 elections by just 44 votes. He belongs to the Adi Tribe.

References

Indian National Congress politicians
People from Adi Community
Arunachal Pradesh MLAs 2009–2014
Living people
Bharatiya Janata Party politicians from Arunachal Pradesh
21st-century Indian politicians
Year of birth missing (living people)